Marthinus Prinsloo (1838 - 1903) was an Orange Free State Boer farmer, politician and general in the Second Boer War (1899-1902). He was born of Nicolaas Frans Prinsloo (1813-1890) and Isabella Johanna Petronella Rautenbach (1819-around 1908) in the district of Graaff-Reinet, South Africa who migrated to the Orange Free State where they lived in Bloemfontein, Waterval and Bethlehem.

Early career
In August 1867 Prinsloo was elected field cornet (Afrikaans: veldkornet) in the Winburg Commando because of his strong showing in the Free State–Basotho Wars. As a reward for his war time performance, he was also given the Leeuwspruit farm in the Ladybrand district. He married Elsie Petronella Jacoba Botha (1839-1903) who would give him five sons and eight daughters. In 1876 Prinsloo was elected a Member of the Volksraad (House of Assembly) of the Orange Free State in Bloemfontein for Koranaberg and served on several committees, establishing a reputation as an eloquent speaker. He returned to his family farm of Waterval and was elected in 1883 to the Volksraad representing Taaiboschspruit (Winburg). He continued commander of the Winburg Commando and was a justice of the peace. In 1889 he retired from public life, bought the Vredepoort farm near Kwestiefontein (Bloemfontein) and turned wealthy.

Second Boer War

Attack of the Colony of Natal
After the call to arms in the Orange Free State on 2 October 1899 the commandos of the Boer towns of Bethlehem, Harrismith, Heilbron, Kroonstad, Vrede, and Winburg chose Prinsloo as their Commandant-General to lead the army of the Orange Free State into Natal. He partook of the siege of Ladysmith (2 November 1899 - 28 February 1900) and fought several battles.

Prinsloo and general Schalk Burger were later criticised for their lack of direction when the Boers attacked the strongholds of Caesar's Camp and Wagon Hill at Platrand massif just south of Ladysmith on January 6, 1900. Following the Battle of Spion Kop on 23–24 January 1900 Prinsloo was in command at the front on the Tugela River. After the relief of Ladysmith on 1 March 1900 he commanded at Van Reenen's Pass. He was then chosen by Orange Free State president Steyn to temporarily command Orange Free State troops in the Brandwater Basin in the east of the Free State.

Surrender by Prinsloo
Prinsloo and his men guarded the mountain passes of the Drakensberg while generals Christiaan de Wet, Paul Roux and Jonathan Crowther would each retreat with their troops northwards and eastwards. De Wet escaped escorting president Steyn, while the remainder of the army instead failed to defend the pass Slabbert's Nek and gave up Retief's Nek after a fight on 23–24 July 1900. The British surrounded Prinsloo by also blocking the passes of Witnek, Kommandonek, Noupoortsnek (Nauwpoortsnek) and finally the Golden Gate pass to the east on the Little Caledon River, so that Prinsloo felt forced to surrender with his army to general Archibald Hunter on 30 July 1900. Some 4300 of his troops including Prinsloo, Roux and Crowther were taken prisoner of war near Fouriesburg, most of them at Surrender Hill. This was the largest number of Boers captured in the war so far, even more than the 4000 at the surrender of general Piet Cronjé at Paardeberg on 27 February 1900. While most of the prisoners from Prinsloo's army were sent to India, Prinsloo himself was held captive at Simon's Town. After the war he returned to his farm where he died in 1903.
Prinsloo's surrender in 1900 was viewed by some of his compatriots as a treasonous act. Christiaan de Wet called it a “a horrible murder of government, country and people” (Afrikaans: ’n gruwelike moord op regering, land en volk).

Bibliography 
 M. P. Bossenbroek, Yvette Rosenberg (Translator), The Boer War, Seven Stories Press, New York, NY, 2018. ISBN 9781609807474, 1609807472. Pages 144–145, 197, 284–285.
 Darrell Hall and Fransjohan Pretorius, The Hall handbook of the Anglo-Boer War, 1899-1902, University of Natal Press, Pietermaritzburg, 1999. ISBN 0-86980-943-1. Pages 18, 28, 135, 149.
 Thomas Pakenham 
 The Boer War, George Weidenfeld & Nicolson, London, 1979. Abacus, 1992. ISBN 0 349 10466 2. Pages 170, 174, 192–193, 195, 197, 199, 443–445, 454.
 The Scramble for Africa, 1876-1912, Random House, New York, 1991. ISBN 0-349-10449-2. (General reference with Chapter 31. Milner's War, pages 557-582 on the Boer War 1899-1902.)

Gallery

References

1838 births
1903 deaths
Afrikaner people
Boer generals
Members of the Volksraad of the Orange Free State
Orange Free State generals
Orange Free State military personnel of the Second Boer War
People from Graaff-Reinet
People of the Second Boer War
South African military personnel